ErythroMer is a red blood substitute in development funded by the National Institutes of Health and U.S. Department of Defense. Similar to other HBOCs, the product is stable for several months even when freeze-dried, and can be reconstituted from its lyophilized state in emergency situations. This opens up the possibility of eventual stockpiling of ErythoMer making it easier to supply blood in large amounts to those who need it.

The development of this technology was done at Washington University in St. Louis and UIUC. Trials have been successful in rats, mice, and rabbits, and human trials are planned.

ErythroMer is a reddish blood powder composed from hemoglobin from humans. By coating it with a synthetic polymer, it is able to sense pH changes, allowing for oxygen pick up in areas where the pH levels are high, and disposal where the levels are low.

References

Blood substitutes
Washington University in St. Louis
University of Illinois Urbana-Champaign